Nikolai Myaskovsky composed his Cello Concerto in C minor, Op. 66, during the years 1944–45.  It ranks among the few works of the composer that is to be found frequently in concert or on recordings.

Background

The concerto was written for Sviatoslav Knushevitsky, one of Myaskovsky's great champions, who premiered it in Moscow on 17 March 1945.  The first recording, however, was made by Mstislav Rostropovich in 1956.

Structure

The concerto is in two movements:
Lento ma non troppo – Andante – Tempo I
Allegro vivace – Piu marcato – Meno mosso – Tempo I

The total duration of the concerto amounts to about 25 minutes.  The piece is among the late works of the composer, and among its melodies appear Russian folk songs.

References
Notes

Sources

External links
 PD-CA only.

1944 compositions
Compositions by Nikolai Myaskovsky
Myaskovsky